Damson gin is a liqueur, usually homemade, made from damson plums macerated in a sugar and gin syrup for eight weeks or more. Vodka is sometimes used in place of the gin. The proof will vary somewhat but generally is around 44.

Damson gin is especially popular in Britain. The plums are ripe in early September and the liqueur can be used as a Christmas treat. Greengage gin is an alternative beverage.

Averell Damson Gin is produced by the American Gin Co. and is an American take on the beverage. Rather than steeping the damson plums in gin, Averell is made by combining the fresh juice of the fruit with gin and sugar.

See also
 Sloe gin
 Slivovitz

External links
 Damson Gin Recipe, The Cottage Smallholder

Gins
British liqueurs
Fruit liqueurs
Plum dishes